Quick Draw is a 2013-2014 television series created by Nancy Hower and John Lehr for Hulu. Lehr stars in, and Hower directs, this partly improvised half-hour comedy Western. The show follows Harvard graduate John Henry Hoyle who becomes the sheriff of Great Bend, Kansas, in 1875.

The show marks Hulu's third foray into original scripted programming. It premiered online on August 5, 2013.

Overview
Fresh off the stagecoach from Harvard, Sheriff John Henry Hoyle and his reluctant Deputy Eli introduce the emerging science of forensics to hunt down the Wild West’s most dangerous criminals.

Cast and characters
John Lehr as Sheriff John Henry Hoyle, Harvard graduate
 Nick Brown as Deputy Eli Brocias
 Allison Dunbar as Honey Shaw
 Alexia Dox as Pearl Starr
 Bob Clendenin as Vernon Shank
 Brian O'Connor as Cole Younger

Production
On April 30, 2013, Hulu announced two new original television series, The Awesomes and Quick Draw. On August 5, Hulu debuted the first two episodes of Quick Draw.  On November 4, 2013, Hulu announced it would renew the show for a ten-episode second season, which began on August 7, 2014.

Episodes

Season 1 (2013)

Webisodes

Season 2 (2014)

References

External links

2010s American comedy television series
2010s Western (genre) television series
2013 American television series debuts
2014 American television series endings
English-language television shows
Hulu original programming